The 70th running of the Tour of Flanders cycling race was held on 6 April 1986. It was won by Dutch rider Adrie van der Poel in a four-man sprint before Ireland's Sean Kelly.

Race summary
A breakaway of ten riders was formed after the Koppenberg, from which Belgian Eddy Planckaert and Canadian Steve Bauer broke clear at 30 km from the finish. Bauer dropped Planckaert on the Muur van Geraardsbergen, but was joined by Sean Kelly, Adrie van der Poel and Jean-Philippe Vandenbrande at 7 km from the finish. In a four-man sprint, Dutchman van der Poel surprisingly beat Kelly. Vandenbrande was third, Bauer – the first Canadian cyclist in the top-10 – fourth.

Route
The race started in Sint-Niklaas and finished in Meerbeke (Ninove) – totaling 274 km.
The course featured 12 categorized climbs:

Results

External links
Video of the 1986 Tour of Flanders  on Sporza (in Dutch)

References

Tour of Flanders
Tour of Flanders
Tour of Flanders
1986 Super Prestige Pernod International